Laurel Hill Tunnel is a  tunnel on the Pennsylvania Turnpike that was bypassed and abandoned in 1964. It is bored through Laurel Ridge, spanning the border of Westmoreland and Somerset counties. Its western portal may be seen from the eastbound side of the Turnpike at milepost 99.3.

The tunnel was built for the never-completed South Pennsylvania Railroad, as were two other tunnels to its east—Sideling Hill and Rays Hill—that were similarly on the original Turnpike and abandoned after being bypassed.

Bypass

The tunnels on the Turnpike had been bottlenecks ever since the Turnpike's opening in 1940 due to reduced speeds and two-way traffic in a single tube. A second tube was added to four tunnels—Allegheny Mountain, Tuscarora Mountain, Kittatinny Mountain, and Blue Mountain—where it was the less expensive option.

Unlike the Sideling Hill and Rays Hill tunnels, the Laurel Hill Tunnel is not on the bypassed section commonly known as the Abandoned Pennsylvania Turnpike and is still owned by the Pennsylvania Turnpike Commission. It is not open to the public and is routinely patrolled by the Pennsylvania State Police for trespassers.

The highest point on the Turnpike, is on the Laurel Hill Tunnel bypass at Mile 100.45 in Somerset County.

Testing use
The tunnel is used by Chip Ganassi Racing for high-speed race car aerodynamic testing. The tunnel has been repaved, equipped with climate control, safety equipment, and data collection systems. The tunnel was first used for testing in 2004 to develop the G-Force Indycar.

References

Interstate 70
Interstate 76 (Ohio–New Jersey)
Transportation buildings and structures in Somerset County, Pennsylvania
Transportation buildings and structures in Westmoreland County, Pennsylvania
Tunnels completed in 1940
Pennsylvania Turnpike Commission
Former toll tunnels in the United States
Former toll roads in Pennsylvania
Road tunnels in Pennsylvania
1940 establishments in Pennsylvania